Touchet is a surname, and may refer to:

Members of the English peerage:
 James Touchet, 5th Baron Audley, (c. 1398–1459)
 George Thicknesse-Touchet, 19th Baron Audley (1758–1818)
 George Thicknesse-Touchet, 20th Baron Audley, (1783–1837)
 George Edward Thicknesse-Touchet, 21st Baron Audley (1817–1872)
 Mary Thicknesse-Touchet, 22nd Baroness Audley  (1868–1942)
 Thomas Touchet-Jesson, 23rd Baron Audley (1913–1963)

Other people:
 George Anselm Touchet (died c. 1689), Roman Catholic chaplain of Queen Catherine of Braganza, the wife of King Charles II
 Jacques Touchet (fl. 1917), French illustrator
 Marie Touchet, (1549– 1638), mistress of Charles IX of France
 Stanislas Touchet (1842–1926), French Cardinal of the Roman Catholic Church

See also
 Touchet, Washington, US
 Touchet River, US
 Touchet Formation
 Touche (disambiguation)